Ada Hautala (born 14 October 2003) is a Finnish artistic gymnast.  She represented Finland at the 2018 Youth Olympic Games and is the 2019 Finnish national champion.

Early life
Hautala was born in Liminka, Finland.  She began training in gymnastics in 2010.

Gymnastics career

Junior

2016–17
Hautala competed at the 2016 Finnish national championships where she placed tenth in the all-around but first on balance beam.  She later competed at the Mälarcupen where she placed tenth.

In 2017 Hautala won her first junior national title at the Finnish national championships.  She next competed at the Nordic Championships where she helped Finland finish first as a team and individually placed tenth.  At the 2017 European Youth Olympic Festival Hautala helped Finland place 13th.

2018
Hautala competed at the Finnish National Championships where she placed second in the all-around and on vault behind Nitta Nieminen and placed first on the other three apparatuses.  She next competed at the Youth Olympic Games Qualifier where she placed 20th.  In doing so she qualified a spot for Finland.  Hautala competed at the European Championships and finished 32nd in qualifications.  Hautala was selected to represent Finland at the 2018 Youth Olympic Games.  While there she finished ninth in the all-around and was second reserve for the balance beam final.

Senior

2019–20
Hautala turned senior in 2019.  She competed at the European Championships and finished 41st in qualifications.  She won the senior national title at the Finnish Championships.  Hautala competed at the Koper Challenge Cup where she finished seventh and sixth on balance beam and floor exercise respectively.

The mass majority of competitions in 2020 were either canceled or postponed due to the global COVID-19 pandemic.  In November Hautala competed at the Finnish Championships where she placed second behind Enni Kettunen. Additionally she placed first on balance beam and floor exercise.

2021
Hautala at the 2021 European Championships where she qualified to the all-around final.  During the final she placed twenty-first.  At the Finnish national championships she placed fifth.  Hautala was selected to represent Finland at the World Championships alongside Maisa Kuusikko and Rosanna Ojala.  During qualifications she finished 27th in the all-around and was the third reserve for the final.

Competitive history

References

External links
 

2003 births
Living people
Finnish female artistic gymnasts
Sportspeople from Oulu
Gymnasts at the 2018 Summer Youth Olympics